Claudia Lee Hae-in (born 7 June 1945) is a South Korean Catholic nun, poet, and essayist. She has sold almost two million copies of her books of poetry and been regarded as "Korea's next contender for the Nobel Prize in Literature" after the poet Ko Un and novelist Hwang Sok-yong.

Biography 
Lee Hae-in was born on 7 June 1945, in Yanggu County, Gangwon to Catholic parents, Lee Dae-young and Kim Sun-ok. Three days after she was born, she was baptized Catholic with the name Velladetta. At a very young age, she displayed immense literary talent. At the outbreak of the Korean War on 25 June 1950, her father was detained and taken to North Korea and the remaining family were forced to flee to Busan, South Korea.

After completing her secondary education, she entered religious life in 1964 as an Olivetan Benedictine Sister in Busan. She pronounced her first vows in 1968 and perpetual vows in 1976. She graduated with a degree in English from the Saint Louis University in Baguio, Philippines.

From 1992 to 1997, she was appointed as the General-Secretary of her order in Korea. She was diagnosed with rectal cancer in 2008, and after receiving medical treatments, has returned to good health. In 2015, fake news spread on the internet claiming the nun had died, which she jokingly ignored by saying, "I could forgive the fake news, but I can't go easy on the fake poem."

She had solid friendship with the poet Park Wan-suh and the Venerable Buddhist monk Beopjeong, whom she both noted as having greatly influenced her in life and works.

Writing

Poetry 

Lee made her debut as a poet with the poem "Flower Shovel" in the Catholic Journal Soyeon in 1970. The poem was a conversation with a natural occurrence based on her daily experiences. Her reputation as a poet grew following the publication in 1976 of her first collection of poems titled, The Land of Dandelions. She became known for her works because of its clarity and simplicity, and its usage of plain Korean language with deep-seated messages and meanings which makes the readers reflect.

Other inspiring collections of Lee's poetry and essays include; Light a Fire in My Soul (1979), The Face of Time (1989), A Little Prayer (2011), Happiness of Waiting (2018) and As If Leaves Are Seen After Flowers Fall (2011). Her poem "The Love Song of a Dandelion" which is a reflection on both consolation and hope appeared in Korean middle school text books.

From 1998 to 2002, she carried out her missionary works through a literary forum called "Hae-in's Writing Room" and delivered a series of lectures in various parts of the country on the theme "Poetry and Spirituality in Life."

Awards and recognitions 
She has received six awards for her outstanding contributions to literature:
 1981: New Sprouts Literary Award
 1985: Donga Women's Prize
 1985: Busan Women's Literature Award
 2004: Woollim Arts Award
 2006: Cheong Sang-beong Literary Award
 2016: Gumin Award

Publications 
From an early age, Lee Hae-in was passionate about writing and as a Catholic nun explored the significant connections between poetry and spirituality. She has published 17 collections of poetry and 12 books on essays, which are included in high school textbooks.

Poetry collections 
 The Land of Dandelions 《민들레의 영토》 (1976, Catholic Books Publishing)
 Light A Fire in my Soul 《내 혼에 불을 놓아》 (1979, Bundo Books)
 If I Rise as a Half-Moon Today 《오늘은 내가 반달로 떠도》 (1979, Bundo Books)
 The Face of Time 《시간의 얼굴》 (1989, Bundo Books)
 Mommy and the Sunflower 《엄마와 분꽃》 (1992, Bundo Books)
 To Be an Empty House in a Secluded Village 《외딴 마을의 빈집이 되고 싶다》 (1999, Yolimwon Publishing)
 I Can't Wear Other Clothes 《다른 옷은 입을 수가 없네》 (1999, Yolimwon Publishing)
 Small Comfort 《작은 위로》 (2002, Yolimwon Publishing)
 Small Joy 《작은 기쁨》 (2007, Yolimwon Publishing)
 Mom 《엄마》 (2008, Samtoh Publishing)
 Hope Is Awake 《희망은 깨어있네》 (2010, Mind Walk Books)
 A Little Prayer 《작은기도》 (2011, Yolimwon Publishing)
 Hae-in Lee Poems 《이해인 시전집》 (2013, Literary Thought)
 Like a Camelia When It Blooms and Withers 《필 때도 질 때도 동백꽃처럼》 (2014, Mind Walk Books)
 Whenever We Love Each Other, It's Always Spring 《서로 사랑하면 언제라도 봄》 (2015, Yellimul Publishing)
 To a Friend 《친구에게》 (2019, Samtoh Publishing)
 Like a Single Petal 《꽃잎 한 장처럼》 (2022, Samtoh Publishing)

Essays 
 Durebak 《두레박》 (1986, Bundo Books)
 Flower Shovel 《꽃삽》 (1994, Samtoh Publishing)
 When You Love, You Become a Star 《사랑할 땐 별이 되고》 (1997, Samtoh Publishing)
 Like a Flower That Speaks With Its Scents 《향기로 말을 거는 꽃처럼》 (2002, Spring Co.)
 The Window Where Happiness Rests 《기쁨이 열리는 창》 (2004, Mind Walk Books)
 Flower Pots 《풀꽃 단상》 (2006, Bundo Books)
 Love Is A Lonely Struggle 《사랑은 외로운 투쟁》 (2006, Mind Walk Books)
 As If Leaves Are Seen After Flowers Fall 《꽃이 지고 나면 잎이 보이듯이》 (2011, Samtoh Publishing)
 A Kind Heart Becomes a Flower, A Kind Word Becomes a Light 《고운 마음 꽃이 되고 고운 말은 빛이 되고》 (2018, Spring Co.)
 Happiness of Waiting 《기다리는 행복》 (2018, Samtoh Publishing)
 Don't Miss That Love 《그 사랑 놓치지 마라》 (2019, Samtoh Publishing)
 Lee Hae-in's Words 《이해인의 말》 (2020, Mind Walk Books)

Autobiography 
 Insights for a Good Life and Relationships; The Word of Understanding 《좋은 삶과 관계를 위한 통찰력; 이해의 말씀》

See also 

Korean literature
Korean poetry

References

External links 
 Olivetan Benedictine Sisters
 Claudia Lee Hae-in, OSB
 Two poems by Sister Claudia Lee Hae-in

1945 births
Living people
People from Gangwon Province, South Korea
Benedictine nuns
Catholic poets
Saint Louis University (Philippines) alumni
Sogang University alumni
20th-century South Korean poets
21st-century South Korean poets
South Korean women poets
20th-century South Korean women writers
21st-century South Korean women writers